Mudbox is a proprietary computer-based 3D sculpting and painting tool.  developed by Autodesk, Mudbox was created by Skymatter, founded by Tibor Madjar, David Cardwell and Andrew Camenisch, former artists of Weta Digital, where it was first used to produce the 2005 Peter Jackson remake of King Kong. Mudbox's primary application is high-resolution digital sculpting, texture painting, and displacement and normal map creation, although it is also used as a design tool.

History 

Mudbox was developed by Skymatter in New Zealand as the founders David Cardwell, Tibor Madjar and Andrew Camenisch were working on The Lord of the Rings at Weta Digital circa 2001. They created the software to expand their own toolsets, and Mudbox was first used as a complete product in the 2005 film King Kong. The beta was released in May 2006, followed by version 1.0 in mid-February 2007. On August 6, 2007, Autodesk announced the acquisition of Skymatter.

Features 

Mudbox's user interface is a 3D environment that allows the creation of movable cameras that can be bookmarked. Models created within the program typically start as a polygon mesh that can be manipulated with a variety of different tools. A model can be subdivided to increase its resolution and the number of polygons available to sculpt with. 3D layers allow the user to store different detail passes, blending them with multiplier sliders and layer masks. Using layers, the user is able to sculpt and mold their 3D model without making permanent changes.

As a detailing app, Mudbox can import and export .obj, .fbx, and .bio files, as well as its own .mud format. A typical workflow is to create a relatively simple (low polygon count) model in a 3D modeling application and then import it to Mudbox for sculpting. Subdivision of models occurs using the Catmull-Clark subdivision algorithm.

The sculpting tool set contains an assortment of brushes with adjustable falloffs.

The use of 3D layers allows for design visualization, non-destructive sculpting, and high polygon counts. Since the layers combine additively, their ordering is unimportant for the final model and may be created arbitrarily. Curves can be created and projected on a mesh for use as precise masking. All of the standard transform and selection tools are there as well. Paint layers were added in Mudbox 2009.

Design visualization plays an important role in Mudbox's production value. Simple poly primitives can be created from within Mudbox, facilitating the creation of busts, props, terrain, etc.

Mudbox also includes stamps and stencils. Stencils work by overlaying a grayscale, or "alpha channel" image, such as a bump map, over the mesh. The artist can then project part or all of the image's detail onto the mesh through brush strokes, providing a method to quickly sculpt surface detail.

The underlying architecture of Mudbox was updated in Mudbox 2009, to allow the sculpting of models with larger polygon counts compared to earlier versions. In Mudbox 2009, 3D painting and texturing features were introduced to allow artists to paint directly on their models in 3D. In addition, features to display the model with a depth of field and ambient occlusion were added for the release.

In Mudbox 2010, an application programming interface (API) was introduced via a software development kit (SDK). In addition, functionality to improve file interoperability with other 3D applications (Autodesk Maya, 3ds Max etc.) was added via the FBX file format.

Interface 
Mudbox's interface includes menus, tabbed windows, and tool trays and can be customized to a limited extent. It also provides keyboard shortcuts. The navigation in the 3D view is similar to that of Autodesk Maya.

Awards 

On February 15, 2014, Canadians Andrew Camenisch, David Cardwell and Canadian-Hungarian Tibor Madjar were honored by the Academy of Motion Picture Arts and Sciences with an Academy Award for Technical Achievement for scientific and technical achievement for the concept and design, along with Csaba Kőhegyi and Imre Major, two Hungarians educated at Debrecen University, for the implementation of the Mudbox software.

Releases 

 October 2007, Autodesk released version 1.07 of Mudbox.
 October 2008, Autodesk released Mudbox 2009 (v2) of Mudbox.
 August 2009, Autodesk released Mudbox 2010 (v3) of Mudbox.
 March 2010, Autodesk released Mudbox 2011 (v4) of Mudbox.
 September 2010, Autodesk released Mudbox 2011 SAP (v4.5) of Mudbox.
 April 2011, Autodesk released Mudbox 2012 (v5) of Mudbox.
 April 2012, Autodesk released Mudbox 2013 (v6) of Mudbox.
 April 2013, Autodesk released Mudbox 2014 (v7) of Mudbox.
 April 2014, Autodesk released Mudbox 2015 (v8) of Mudbox.
 April 2015, Autodesk released Mudbox 2016 (v9) of Mudbox.
 April 2016, Autodesk released Mudbox 2017 (v10) of Mudbox.
 April 2017, Autodesk released Mudbox 2018 (v11) of Mudbox.
 April 2018, Autodesk released Mudbox 2019 (v12) of Mudbox.
 April 2019, Autodesk released Mudbox 2020 (v13) of Mudbox.
 April 2020, Autodesk released Mudbox 2021 (v14) of Mudbox.
 April 2021, Autodesk released Mudbox 2022 (v15) of Mudbox.
 April 2022, Autodesk released Mudbox 2023 (v16) of Mudbox.

See also
Blender
ZBrush

References

External links
Autodesk Mudbox Homepage
Mudbox Forums
MudboxCentral Tutorials, News and Jobs
Mudbox Russian Community
Mudbox video tutorials

Mudbox
Academy Award for Technical Achievement winners
3D modeling software for Linux
Proprietary commercial software for Linux